Stylantheus is a genus of pea and bean weevils in the beetle family Chrysomelidae. There is one described species in Stylantheus, S. macrocerus.

References

Further reading

 
 
 

Bruchinae
Articles created by Qbugbot
Chrysomelidae genera